Hold On may refer to:

Music

Albums and EPs
 Hold On! (album), by Herman's Hermits, 1966
 Hold On (Trapeze album), or the title song, 1978
 Hold On (High Inergy album), 1980
 Hold On (Nitty Gritty Dirt Band album), 1987
 Hold On (Spencer Tracy EP), 2003
 Hold On (Name Taken album), 2004
 Hold On (Rapture Ruckus EP), 2010
 Hold On! It's Joe Tex, or simply titled Hold On!, 1965
 Hold On, by Dan Hill, 1976
 Hold On, by Noel Pointer, 1978
 Hold On, by Lisa Hartman, 1979
 Hold On, by Carolyne Mas, 1980
 Hold On, by Mordechai Ben David, 1984
 Hold On, by Jaki Graham, 1995
 Hold On, by Vineyard UK, 2004
 Hold On, by Ian McNabb and various artists, 2012

Songs
 "Hold On" (folk song), also known as "Gospel Plow",
 "Hold On" (John Lennon song), 1970
 "Hold On" (Triumph song), 1979
 "Hold On" (Kansas song), 1980
 "Hold On" (Badfinger song), 1981
 "Hold On" (Santana song), 1982, originally by Ian Thomas (1981)
 "Hold On" (Yes song), 1983
 "Hold On" (Rosanne Cash song), 1986
 "Hold On (A Little Longer)", a song by Steve Wariner, 1988
 "Hold On" (En Vogue song), 1990
 "Hold On" (Wilson Phillips song), 1990
 "Hold On" (Sarah McLachlan song), 1993
 "Hold On" (Tanya Blount song), 1994
 "Hold On" (Alexia song), 1997
 "Hold On" (Good Charlotte song), 2003
 "Bottle Living/Hold On", a single by Dave Gahan, 2003
 "Hold On" (Stellar Kart song), 2006
 "Hold On" (KT Tunstall song), 2007
 "Hold On" (Korn song), 2007
 "Hold On" (Jonas Brothers song), 2007
 "Hold On" (Måns Zelmerlöw song), 2009
 "Hold On" (Michael Bublé song), 2009
 "Hold On" (Alabama Shakes song), 2012
 "Hold On (Shut Up)", a song by MGK, 2012
 "Hold On" (SBTRKT song), 2012
 "Hold On" (Sean Paul song), 2012
 "Hold On" (Skepta song), 2012
 "Hold On" (Colbie Caillat song), 2013
 "Hold On" (Nervo song), 2013
 "Hold On" (50 Cent song), 2014
 "Hold On" (Nano song), 2017
 "Hold On" (Lil Tjay song), 2019
 "Hold On" (Justin Bieber song), 2021
 "Hold On", by 22-20s from 22-20s
 "Hold On", by 33Miles from 33Miles
 "Hold On", by 911 from Moving On
 "Hold On", by Abandon from Searchlights
 "Hold On", by Acceptance from Black Lines to Battlefields EP
 "Hold On", by Adele from 30
 "Hold On", by Aiden Grimshaw from Misty Eye
 "Hold On", by Air Supply from Mumbo Jumbo
 "Hold On", by All That Remains from For We Are Many
 "Hold On", by the Almost, a bonus track from Southern Weather
 "Hold On", by the Angels from Red Back Fever
 "Hold On", by Angus & Julia Stone from Down the Way
 "Hold On", by Annie from The A&R EP
 "Hold On", by Antje Duvekot from Big Dream Boulevard
 "Hold On", by April Wine from Walking Through Fire
 "Hold On", by Artist vs. Poet from the Japanese edition of Favorite Fix album
 "Hold On", by Atlantic Starr from Love Crazy
 "Hold On", by Avec Sans
 "Hold On", by B*Witched from The Princess Diaries soundtrack
 "Hold On", by Barbara Dickson from You Know It's Me
 "Hold On", by Bassnectar from Noise vs. Beauty
 "Hold On", by Be Good, a bonus track from Seven Star Hotel
 "Hold On", by The Beekeepers
 "Hold On", by Benjamin Orr from The Lace
 "Hold On", by Beres Hammond
 "Hold On", by Bernie Worrell from All the Woo in the World
 "Hold On", by Beth Croft from Rule in My Heart
 "Hold On", by Bif Naked from Purge
 "Hold On", by Billy Branigan from the soundtrack for the film Jumpin' Jack Flash
 "Hold On", by Black Box from Dreamland
 "Hold On", by Bonham from Mad Hatter
 "Hold On", by Brad Whitford and Derek St. Holmes from Whitford/St. Holmes
 "Hold On", by Brand Nubian from Everything Is Everything
 "Hold On", by Bread of Stone from The Real Life
 "Hold On", by Britny Fox from Britny Fox
 "Hold On", by CAB from CAB 4
 "Hold On", by Cappadonna from The Pilgrimage
 "Hold On", by Carole King from Simple Things
 "Hold On", by Cascada from Evacuate the Dancefloor
 "Hold On", by Cast from the single "Live the Dream"
 "Hold On", by the Chain Gang of 1974
 "Hold On", by Charlie Simpson from Young Pilgrim
 "Hold On", by Cherri Bomb from This Is the End of Control
 "Hold On", by Chicago from Chicago XIV
 "Hold On", by Chord Overstreet
 "Hold On", by Chris Cayzer from the television series Bituing Walang Ningning
 "Hold On", by Chris de Burgh from Far Beyond These Castle Walls
 "Hold On", by Chris Smither from Small Revelations
 "Hold On", by Cliff Richard from Silver
 "Hold On", by the Commodores from Movin' On
 "Hold On", by Conception from Flow
 "Hold On", by Corey Hart from the soundtrack for the 1987 film Beverly Hills Cop II
 "Hold On", by Crack the Sky
 "Hold On", by the Crusaders from Royal Jam
 "Hold On", by Crystal Bowersox from Farmer's Daughter
 "Hold On", by Crystal Kay, B-side of the single "Journey (Kimi to Futari de)"
 "Hold On", by Curren$y from Pilot Talk II
 "Hold On", by Dan Hill from Hold On
 "Hold On", by Dannii Minogue from Get Into You Deluxe Edition
 "Hold On", by Darius Rucker from Back to Then
 "Hold On", by Dashboard Confessional, a bonus track from The Swiss Army Romance
 "Hold On", by David Archuleta from Forevermore
 "Hold On", by David Banner from The Greatest Story Ever Told
 "Hold On", by David Gray from Lost Songs 95–98
 "Hold On", by Dead by April from Let the World Know
 "Hold On", by Dee C. Lee
 "Hold On", by Deep Purple from Stormbringer
 "Hold On", by Delta Goodrem from Wings of the Wild
 "Hold On", by the Desert Rose Band from Life Goes On
 "Hold On", by the Devin Townsend Project from Epicloud
 "Hold On", by Dina Carroll from So Close
 "Hold On", by Dissident Prophet from 21st Century Spin
 "Hold On", by Divinefire from Eye of the Storm
 "Hold On", by DiY from the Fabric compilation album Fabric 14
 "Hold On", by Donavon Frankenreiter from Glow
 "Hold On", by Donna Hughes and Mary Chapin Carpenter
 "Hold On", by Donny Osmond from Donny Osmond
 "Hold On", by Duke Dumont
 "Hold On", by Dwele from Subject
 "Hold On", by Dynamic Praise from Faith
 "Hold On", by El Da Sensei from The Unusual
 "Hold On", by El Presidente from El Presidente Deluxe Edition
 "Hold On", by Elemeno P from Love & Disrespect
 "Hold On", by Emmylou Harris from All I Intended to Be
 "Hold On", by Enchantment from Enchantment
 "Hold On", by Enemy You from the various artists compilation album Four on the Floor
 "Hold On", by Eric Clapton from August
 "Hold On", by E.S.G. from Shinin' n' Grindin'
 "Hold On", by Euroboys from Soft Focus
 "Hold On", by Evermore from My Own Way
 "Hold On", by the Exponents from Something Beginning with C
 "Hold On", by Flame from Our World: Redeemed
 "Hold On", by Foreign Beggars from Asylum Speakers
 "Hold On", by Former Ghosts from Fleurs
 "Hold On", by Freddie Mercury and Jo Dare from the film 
 "Hold On", by Friendly Fires from Pala
 "Hold On", by Gail Davies from Givin' Herself Away
 "Hold On", by Gary Clark, Jr. from The Story of Sonny Boy Slim
 "Hold On", by Gary U.S. Bonds from On the Line
 "Hold On", by Gazza featuring Zola from Still the King
 "Hold On", by George Alice, 2022
 "Hold On", by Gigi D'Agostino from Some Experiments
 "Hold On", by Gladys Knight & The Pips from the Claudine film soundtrack
 "Hold On", by Go Radio from Lucky Street
 "Hold On", by Great White from Great White
 "Hold On", by Green Day from Warning
 "Hold On", by Half Japanese from Perfect
 "Hold On!", by Herman's Hermits from Hold On!
 "Hold On", by the Hippos from The Hippos
 "Hold On", by the Hollies from Distant Light
 "Hold On", by Holly Cole from Dark Dear Heart
 "Hold On", by Holly Woods from Live It Up!
 "Hold On", by Holy Ghost! from the mix album Late Night Tales: Snow Patrol
 "Hold On", by Homemade Knives from No One Doubts the Darkness
 "Hold On", by Hootie & the Blowfish from Imperfect Circle, 2019
 "Hold On", by Hostyle Gospel from Desperation
 "Hold On", by Hot Chip from Made in the Dark
 "Hold On", by Ian Gomm
 "Hold On", by Ian McLagan from Troublemaker
 "Hold On", by Icon from More Perfect Union
 "Hold On", by Icona Pop from This Is... Icona Pop
 "Hold On", by Jack Ingram and Sheryl Crow from This Is It
 "Hold On", by James Grehan from the television series Packed to the Rafters
 "Hold On", by Jamie Walters from Jamie Walters
 "Hold On", by Jammin from the Heartless Crew compilation album Heartless Crew Presents Crisp Biscuit Vol 1
 "Hold On", by Jet, B-side of the single "Put Your Money Where Your Mouth Is"
 "Hold On", by Jimmy Barnes from Two Fires
 "Hold On", by JJ Cale from Troubadour
 "Hold On", by John Conlee from Rose Colored Glasses
 "Hold On", by John Miles from Miles High
 "Hold On", by Johnny Mathis from Right from the Heart
 "Hold On", by Jon Spencer Blues Explosion from Plastic Fang
 "Hold On", by Jonathan Davis from Alone I Play
 "Hold On", by José Nunez featuring Octahvia
 "Hold On", by Jude Johnstone from On a Good Day
 "Hold On", by Julian Lennon from Everything Changes
 "Hold On", by Julie Anne San Jose from Julie Anne San Jose
 "Hold On", by Juliette Schoppmann from Unique
 "Hold On", by Jung Joon Young from Teenager
 "Hold On", by Just Jack from Overtones
 "Hold On", by Justin Bieber from Justice
 "Hold On", by Kareem Salama from Generous Peace
 "Hold On", by Karen Clark Sheard from All in One
 "Hold On", by Kobra and the Lotus from High Priestess
 "Hold On", by the Korgis from This World's for Everyone
 "Hold On", by Kossoff, Kirke, Tetsu and Rabbit from Kossoff, Kirke, Tetsu and Rabbit
 "Hold On", by Kristinia DeBarge from Young & Restless
 "Hold On", by Lazee
 "Hold On", by Leon Bolier
 "Hold On", by Lil' Kim featuring Mary J. Blige from The Notorious K.I.M.
 "Hold On", by Limp Bizkit from Chocolate Starfish and the Hot Dog Flavored Water
 "Hold On", by Lion from Trouble in Angel City
 "Hold On", by Lion Babe from Begin
 "Hold On", by Lisa Brokop from My Love
 "Hold On", by Lisa Miller from Version Originale
 "Hold On", by Los Lobos from The Town and the City
 "Hold On", by Lou Reed from New York
 "Hold On", by Luminous from the compilation album Café del Mar - Dreams: Volume 3
 "Hold On", by L.V. from How Long
 "Hold On", by Mandy Musgrave from the soundtrack album The N Soundtrack
 "Hold On", by Mary Mary from Incredible
 "Hold On", by Matt Darey
 "Hold On", by Melanie Brown from L.A. State of Mind
 "Hold On", by Mental As Anything from Fundamental
 "Hold On", by MercyMe from The Hurt & The Healer
 "Hold On", by Mere from the various artists compilation album AT&T Team USA Soundtrack
 "Hold On", by Michelle Tumes from the various artists compilation album Streams
 "Hold On", by Minus Story from No Rest for Ghosts
 "Hold On", by Mob Rules from Temple of Two Suns
 "Hold On", by Models
 "Hold On", by Moguai
 "Hold On", by Mr. Scruff featuring Andreya Triana from Ninja Tuna
 "Hold On", by Mýa from Smoove Jones
 "Hold On", by The Nadas from Transceiver
 "Hold On", by Natalie Cole from Don't Look Back
 "Hold On", by Nell, an unreleased song
 "Hold On", by Neocolours, also covered by Shamrock
 "Hold On", by New Kids on the Block, B-side of the single "Tonight"
 "Hold On", by Nichole Nordeman from Brave
 "Hold On", by Nitzer Ebb from Showtime
 "Hold On", by the Noel Redding Band from Blowin'
 "Hold On", by Northern Pikes from Neptune
 "Hold On", by Olly Murs from Olly Murs
 "Hold On", by onehundredhours from As Sure as the Stars
 "Hold On", by the Orchids from Lyceum
 "Hold On", by Osibisa from Monsore
 "Hold On", by Pearl Jam from Lost Dogs
 "Hold On", by Pet Shop Boys from Elysium
 "Hold On", by Peter Furler from On Fire
 "Hold On", by Pharoahe Monch from Desire
 "Hold On", by Phil Wickham from Heaven & Earth
 "Hold On", by Phillip Phillips from The World from the Side of the Moon
 "Hold On", by Phrase from Talk with Force
 "Hold On", by Phyllis Hyman from You Know How to Love Me
 "Hold On", by Pilot from Morin Heights
 "Hold On", by the Pinker Tones from Wild Animals
 "Hold On", by Plain White T's, a bonus track from Every Second Counts
 "Hold On", by Popcaan from Where We Come From
 "Hold On", by the Potbelleez from The Potbelleez
 "Hold On", by Purple Ribbon All-Stars from Got Purp? Vol. 2
 "Hold On", by Pusha T featuring Rick Ross from My Name Is My Name
 "Hold On", by Quazedelic featuring Snoop Dogg
 "Hold On", by the Rascals from See
 "Hold On", by Razorlight
 "Hold On", by Reba McEntire from Reba Nell McEntire
 "Hold On", by Red Rockers from Condition Red
 "Hold On", by Reef from Getaway
 "Hold On", by Remedy Drive from Resuscitate
 "Hold On", by Roger Shah and Judge Jules
 "Hold On", by Rollins Band from Get Some Go Again Sessions
 "Hold On", by Rusko featuring Amber Coffman from OMG
 "Hold On", by Rynx and Drew Love
 "Hold On", by Salt-n-Pepa from Brand New
 "Hold On", by Sarkodie featuring Raquel from Sarkology
 "Hold On", by Saving Aimee
 "Hold On", by Sawyer Brown from Outskirts of Town
 "Hold On", by Saxon from Dogs of War
 "Hold On", by SBTRKT, remixed by Thom Yorke (recording as Sisi BakBak)
 "Hold On", by Scott Brothers (The). See discography of Scott Brothers Global
 "Hold On", by Screaming Jets from World Gone Crazy
 "Hold On", by Sean Paul from Tomahawk Technique
 "Hold On", by Selena Gomez and Ben Kweller from Rudderless
 "Hold On", by Senses Fail from The Fire
 "Hold On", by Sepalcure from Sepalcure
 "Hold On", by Shae Jones from Talk Show
 "Hold On", by Shant & Clint Maximus and Jes Brieden
 "Hold On", by Sharon Tandy, B-side of the single "Stay with Me"
 "Hold On", by Shawn McDonald from Simply Nothing
 "Hold On", by Shawn Mendes from Illuminate
 "Hold On", by Silverline from Lights Out
 "Hold On", by Simon Collins from Time for Truth
 "Hold On", by Sister Hazel from Lift
 "Hold On", by Slaughter from The Wild Life
 "Hold On", by Slim Cessna's Auto Club
 "Hold On", by the Special Goodness from Natural
 "Hold On", by Spider Loc from The West Kept Secret: The Prequel
 "Hold On", by Spiritualized from Amazing Grace
 "Hold On", by Spitalfield from Better than Knowing Where You Are
 "Hold On", by Spoken from Breathe Again
 "Hold On", by Stacy Clark from Connect the Dots
 "Hold On", by Starsailor
 "Hold On", by Steve Jones from Fire and Gasoline
 "Hold On", by Steve Winwood from Steve Winwood
 "Hold On", by Stevie Salas
 "Hold On", by Subseven from Free to Conquer
 "Hold On", by Sun 60 from the soundtrack for the 1995 film The Baby-Sitters Club
 "Hold On", by Tajja Isen from the television series Atomic Betty
 "Hold On", by Take That from Beautiful World
 "Hold On", by Tall Tales and True
 "Hold On", by Tamta from Awake
 "Hold On", by Taxiride from Axiomatic
 "Hold On", by Teri DeSario and K.C. from Moonlight Madness
 "Hold On", by Thelma Houston
 "Hold On", by Three Man Army from Mahesha
 "Hold On", by Tim Armstrong from A Poet's Life
 "Hold On", by Timbaland & Magoo featuring Wyclef Jean from Under Construction, Part II
 "Hold On", by Toad the Wet Sprocket from Starting Now
 "Hold On", by TobyMac from Tonight
 "Hold On", by Tom Waits from Mule Variations
 "Hold On", by Trae from The Beginning
 "Hold On", by Trick Daddy from www.thug.com
 "Hold On", by Trick-Trick from The Villain
 "Hold On", by Twin Atlantic from Great Divide
 "Hold On", by Vanilla Sky from The Band Not the Movie
 "Hold On", by the Verlaines from Ready to Fly
 "Hold On", by Warren G from The G Files
 "Hold On", by White Heart from White Heart
 "Hold On", by Wishbone Ash from Twin Barrels Burning
 "Hold On", by Xscape from Traces of My Lipstick
 "Hold On", by Yngwie Malmsteen from Odyssey
 "Hold On", by Yolanda Adams from What a Wonderful Time
 "Hold On", by Young Buck from Buck the World
 "Hold On", from the musical Lysistrata Jones
 "Hold On", the working title of "MH 4.18.2011", by Blink-182 from Neighborhoods

Films
 Hold On! (film) (1966), featuring Herman's Hermits
 Hold On, a 2002 short film featuring Melissa Joan Hart 
 Hold On, a 2008 short film featuring Dominic West

See also
 
 Just Hold On (disambiguation)
 Holding On (disambiguation)